Parvati Temple is a temple dedicated to the goddess Parvati. It may specifically refer to:

 Parvati Temple, Khajuraho
 Parvati Temple, Odisha
 Parvati Temple, located on Parvati Hill, Pune